Craig Smith (born September 5, 1989) is an American ice hockey player, currently playing for the  Washington Capitals in the National Hockey League (NHL). He was selected by the Nashville Predators in the fourth round, 98th overall, of the 2009 NHL Entry Draft.

Playing career
Smith played major junior hockey in the United States Hockey League (USHL) with the Waterloo Black Hawks. He was named to the USHL First All-Star Team for the 2008–09 season.

Smith participated at the 2011 IIHF World Championship as a member of the United States men's national ice hockey team. He then went on to play two years at the University of Wisconsin for the Badgers ice hockey team.

After coming out of college early, Smith became the first player since Colin Wilson to make the Predators without first playing for the team's American Hockey League (AHL) affiliate, which at the time was the Milwaukee Admirals. On October 7, 2011, in a game against the Columbus Blue Jackets, Smith made his NHL debut and scored his first NHL goal, which came against Steve Mason.

Following the 2014–15 season, Smith became a restricted free agent under the NHL Collective Bargaining Agreement. The Predators made him a qualifying offer to retain his NHL rights and, on July 5, 2015, Smith filed for Salary Arbitration. On July 20, prior to his scheduled meeting, Smith entered into a new five-year, $21.25 million contract with the Predators.

On September 29, 2020, after nine seasons with Nashville, Smith informed the team that he would not sign a new contract with them and that he would become a free agent. On October 10, he signed a three-year, $9.3 million contract with the Boston Bruins.

On May 19, 2021, Smith scored the Game 3 double overtime winner for the Bruins against the Washington Capitals, giving them a 2-1 series lead in their first round series. He scored the goal when Capitals goalie Ilya Samsonov misplayed the puck behind the net. Capitals captain Alex Ovechkin controversially scolded him in Russian after the game ended. The Bruins then went on to win the series against the Capitals in five games.

On February 23, 2023, Smith (along with 3 draft picks) was traded from the Bruins to the Washington Capitals in exchange for Garnet Hathaway and Dmitry Orlov.

Personal
Smith graduated from La Follette High School in Madison, Wisconsin.

Career statistics

Regular season and playoffs

International

Awards and honors

References

External links

 

1989 births
Living people
American men's ice hockey forwards
Boston Bruins players
KalPa players
Milwaukee Admirals players
Nashville Predators draft picks
Nashville Predators players
Washington Capitals players
Waterloo Black Hawks players
Wisconsin Badgers men's ice hockey players
Sportspeople from Madison, Wisconsin
Ice hockey players from Wisconsin